Spectacle Island is a privately owned island off Bar Harbor, Maine, United States. , it is the world's ninth most expensive island and is part of the Town of Winter Harbor.

References

External links
Official website

Islands of Hancock County, Maine
Winter Harbor, Maine
Private islands of Maine
Islands of Maine
Coastal islands of Maine